Each of the 48 states of the United States of America plus several of its territories and the District of Columbia issued individual passenger license plates for 1919.

Passenger baseplates

See also

Antique vehicle registration
Electronic license plate
Motor vehicle registration
Vehicle license

References

External links

1919 in the United States
1919